Mike W. Craven (born 1968) is an English crime writer. He is the author of the Washington Poe series and the DI Avison Fluke series. In 2019 his novel The Puppet Show won the Crime Writers' Association Gold Dagger award..

Biography
Craven was born in Carlisle and grew up in Newcastle. He joined the British Army at the age of 16. After two and a half years' training as an armourer, he spent 10 years travelling the world with the army. In 1995, he left the army and began a degree in social work, specialising in criminology, psychology, and substance misuse, before joining the Cumbria Probation Service in Whitehaven as a probation officer. After 16 years of service, with the rank of assistant chief executive, he accepted redundancy, and became a full-time author.

Awards
 2013 CWA Debut Dagger shortlist for Born in a Burial Gown.
 2019 CWA Gold Dagger winner for The Puppet Show.
 2020 CWA Gold Dagger longlist for Black Summer.
 2021 CWA Gold Dagger longlist for The Curator.

Personal life
Craven lives in Carlisle with his wife, Joanne, and his springer spaniel, Bracken.

Novels

Avison Fluke series

Washington Poe series

Reception
Craven's work has been well received in publications such as The Times, Woman & Home, Female First, Whispering Stories, and What's Good To Read

References

External links

English crime fiction writers
1968 births
Living people
English thriller writers
21st-century English novelists
People from Carlisle, Cumbria
21st-century English male writers
British Army soldiers